Protein sel-1 homolog 1 is a protein that in humans is encoded by the SEL1L gene.

Clinical relevance
A mutation in this gene in Finnish Hound dogs have been implicated in cases of cerebellar ataxia. Mutant cells suffer disruptions in their endoplasmic reticula, leading to disease.

References

Further reading